Marita Johansson (born July 9, 1984 in Karlstad) is a Swedish long track speed skater who participates in international competitions.

Personal records

Career highlights

European Allround Championships
2006 - Hamar, 24th
2007 - Collalbo, 23rd
2008 - Kolomna,  20th
World Junior Allround Championships
2003 - Kushiro, 28th
National Championships
2003 - Stockholm,  2nd at allround
2006 - Göteborg,  3rd at 3000 m
2006 - Göteborg,  2nd at 1500 m
2006 - Göteborg,  3rd at 5000 m
2006 - Göteborg,  2nd at allround
2007 - Stockholm,  1st at allround
2008 - Göteborg,  1st at allround
Nordic Junior Games
2003 - Hamar,  2nd at 3000 m
European Youth-23 Games
2005 - Helsinki,  3rd at 3000 m

External links
 
 Johansson at Jakub Majerski's Speedskating Database
 Johansson at SkateResults.com

1984 births
Living people
Swedish female speed skaters
Sportspeople from Karlstad